or  is a lake that is located on the border of Norway and Sweden, about  south of the village of Elvegård in Norway. The Norwegian side lies in Narvik Municipality in Nordland county and the Swedish side lies in Gällivare Municipality in Norrbotten County.

See also
List of lakes in Norway

References

Narvik
Lakes of Nordland
Lakes of Norrbotten County
Norway–Sweden border
International lakes of Europe